Charles Walker Luis Fernandes (3 April 1857 – 12 August 1944) was an English rugby union footballer who played in the 1880s, and cricketer of the 1900s. He played representative level rugby union (RU) for England, and at club level for Leeds, and Yorkshire Wanderers, as a forward, and cricket for the Gentlemen of Yorkshire. Prior to Tuesday 27 August 1895, Leeds was a rugby union club.

Background
Charles Fernandes was born in Wakefield, West Riding of Yorkshire, England, and he died aged 87 in Thirsk, North Riding of Yorkshire, England.

He was the younger brother of Henry Walker Luis Fernandes, and was the older brother of the twins; cricketer Rowland Walker Luis Fernandes, and cricketer Ramsden Walker Luis Fernandes.

Playing career

International honours
Charles Fernandes won caps for England while at Leeds in 1891 against Ireland, Wales, and Scotland.

In the early years of rugby football the goal was to score goals, and a try had zero value, but it provided the opportunity to try at goal, and convert the try to a goal with an unopposed kick at the goal posts. The point values of both the try and goal have varied over time, and in the early years footballers could "score" a try, without scoring any points.

Cricket
Charles Fernandes was also a cricketer, playing for the Gentlemen of Yorkshire against the Household Brigade on Wednesday 3 July 1901.

Business
He was the proprietor of a Brewery.

References

External links
Statistics at espnscrum.com
Biography of Arthur Budd with an England team photograph including Charles Fernandes (surname mis-spelt? Fernandez)
Search for "Fernandes" at rugbyleagueproject.org
Search for "Fernandez" at rugbyleagueproject.org
Football; the Rugby union game

1857 births
1944 deaths
England international rugby union players
English cricketers
English rugby union players
Leeds Rhinos players
Cricketers from Wakefield
Rugby union forwards
Yorkshire Wanderers players
English cricketers of 1890 to 1918
Rugby union players from Wakefield